For another Saint Theodore, see: Theodore Stratelates or Saint Theodore (disambiguation).

Saint Theodore Tiron is one of the two recognized saints called Theodore who are venerated as warrior saints and Great Martyrs in the Catholic Church, Oriental Orthodox Churches and Eastern Orthodox Churches. The other saint of the same name is Theodore Stratelates, also known as Theodore of Heraclea, but this second St Theodore may never have had a separate existence. When the epithet is omitted, the reference is usually to St Theodore Tiron.

He is also known as Theodore Tyron (variously romanized Tyro[n], Tiro[n], Teron). Tīrō is a word from classical Latin meaning a "recently enlisted soldier or recruit". The Latin word was transliterated into Greek with various spellings (Τύρων, Τίρων, Τήρων or Τείρων).

Life and martyrdom 
The veneration of St. Theodore is attested for the late 4th century, less than a century after his martyrdom, when Gregory of Nyssa preached an encomium in his honour at his sanctuary. It is not known if this sanctuary was located at Euchaita or at Amasea, but the existence of a church in Euchaita is ascertained from about 400.
The year of his martyrdom is cited as 287 in the legenda aurea, but later tradition, including Butler (1759) has the year 306.

Nilles (1896) argued that he was not called Tiro for being a recruit but because he served in the Cohors Tyronum. 
When he refused to join in pagan rites of worship, he was arrested, but then set free after a warning. However, he again protested paganism by setting fire to the temple of the Magna Mater (Cybele) at Amasea. He was then tortured, and as he still refused the pagan sacrifice was executed by burning.

The emergence of Theodore Stratelates as a separate saint is attested from the late 9th century. 
The two Theodores were frequently depicted alongside one another in the later Byzantine period. 
Theodore Stratelates had a shrine at Euchaneia, but was said to have originally been from Euchaita.  His "lives" are listed in Bibliotecha Hagiographica Graeca 1760–1773.

St Theodore as dragon-slayer

Iconography of the horseman with spear overcoming evil as personified as a dragon was widespread throughout the Christian period.
Iconographic representations of St Theodore as dragon-slayer are dated to as early as the 7th century, certainly by the early 10th century (the oldest certain depiction of Theodore killing a dragon is at Aghtamar, dated c. 920).
Theodore is reported as having destroyed a dragon near Euchaita in a legend not younger than the late 9th century.
The earliest image of St Theodore as a horseman (named in Latin) is from Vinica, North Macedonia and, if genuine, dates to the 6th or 7th century. Here, Theodore is not slaying a dragon, but holding a draco standard.

The "Christianisation" of the Thracian horseman iconography can be traced to the Cappadocian cave churches of Göreme, where frescoes of the 10th century show military saints on horseback confronting serpents with one, two or three heads. One of the earliest examples is from the church known as Mavrucan 3 , generally dated to the 10th century, which portrays two "sacred riders" confronting a two serpents twined around a tree, in a striking parallel to the Dioskuroi stela, except that the riders are now attacking the snake in the "tree of life" instead of a boar.
In this example, at least, there appear to be two snakes with separate heads, but other examples of 10th-century Cappadocia show polycephalous snakes.
A similar example, but showing three equestrian saints, Demetrius, Theodore and George,
is from the "Zoodochos Pigi" chapel in central Macedonia in Greece, in the prefecture of Kilkis, near the modern village of Kolchida, dated to the 9th or 10th century.

A 12th-century depiction of Theodore as equestrian dragon-slayer is found in four muqarna panels in the nave of the Cappella Palatina in Palermo.

The dragon motif was transferred to the George legend from that of his fellow soldier saint, Saint Theodore Tiro.
The transfer of the dragon iconography from Theodore, or Theodore and George as "Dioskuroi" to George on his own, first becomes tangible in the early 11th century.  The oldest certain images of St. George combatting the serpent date are still found in Cappadocia, in particular the image in the church of Saint Barbara, Soganh (dated 1006 or 1021).

The two St Theodores
Numerous conflicting legends grew up about the life and martyrdom of St Theodore so that, in order to bring some consistency into the stories, it seems to have been assumed that there must have been two different saints, St Theodore Tiron of Amasea and St Theodore Stratelates of Heraclea.

There is much confusion between these two saints, and each of them is sometimes said to have had a shrine at Euchaita in Pontus. In fact the shrine existed before any distinction was made between these two saints. The separate shrine of Stratelates was at Euchaneia, a different place. They were distinguished at least by the 9th century. However it is now generally accepted, at least in the west, that there was in fact only one St Theodore. Hippolyte Delehaye wrote in 1909 that the existence of the second Theodore had not been historically established, and Walter in 2003 wrote that "the Stratelates is surely a fiction".

There were several churches dedicated to both saints, Theodore Tiron and Theodore Stratelates. For instance at Dobarsko and at Serres, at the monastery of Kuprianou at Constantinople and at Pergamon.

Veneration
Veneration of the saint is established for the late 4th century. His cult spread rapidly and he became highly popular. There was a church dedicated to him in Constantinople in the 5th century, and one in Rome by the 6th century.

The center of veneration was in the province of Amasea. From the 9th or 10th century (and possibly earlier), the city of Euchaita, about 30 miles from Amasea housed the relics of the saint and became an important place of pilgrimage. In a tradition recorded in the 10th or 11th century, a woman from Euchaita named Eusebia had transferred the saint's relic according to his wishes. 
The same tradition also associates Theodore with the dragon slayer motif. 
In the late 11th century, the Amasea province was gradually overwhelmed by the Turkish invasion and Euchaita became depopulated.

Gregory of Nyssa said nothing about St Theodore's life beyond the basic legend as given above, but he told how he could influence the lives of his hearers and specifically mentioned that he could intervene in battles. This became a particularly important attribute of St Theodore. 
Theodore was one of the important military saints of Byzantium. After the period of iconoclasm, from the 9th century, he was depicted as a soldier in military dress. A tradition origating in Cappadocia from the 9th or 10th century depicted him as dragon-slayer alongside Saints Demetrius and George. He was adopted as a military saint by the crusaders.

In Western Christianity, he is usually called 'Theodore of Amasea' from the ancient city in Minor Asia where he suffered martyrdom. Sometimes he is called 'Theodore Euchaita', from the place where he was possibly born and to which his body had been carried, and where his shrine was erected later. In Eastern Christianity, he is more often known as Theodore Teron, "Theodore the Recruit".

St Theodore became especially important in the Eastern Orthodox Church, where his cult spread widely. The first church dedicated to him in Constantinople was built in 452, and eventually he had 15 churches in that city. He was famous in Syria, Palestine and Asia Minor. Many churches of the Eastern Orthodox Church are dedicated to him. The oldest Georgian Bir el Qutt inscriptions mention him twice.

In Italy he was shown in a mosaic in the apse of the church of SS. Cosmas & Damian in Rome (dated about 530), and by the next century, he had his own church there at the foot of the Palatine, circular in shape. This church of San Teodoro was made a collegiate church by Pope Felix IV and was made available to the orthodox church in Rome by Pope John Paul II in 2000. This was inaugurated in 2004.

He became the first patron of Venice. The chapel of the Doge was dedicated to him until, in the 9th century, Venice wished to free itself from the influence of Byzantium, and he was succeeded by St Mark (see later section: St Theodore and Venice).

He was not popular in northern Europe beyond Italy. However Chartres Cathedral, in France, has a stained glass window with a series of 38 panels celebrating St Theodore, which date from the 13th century.

Iconography
In mosaics and icons, he is most often shown in military dress from the 6th century, but sometimes in civilian or court dress. 
When on horseback, he is always in military dress, possibly spearing a dragon, and often accompanied by St George. 
Both he and St Theodore Stratelates are shown with thick black hair and pointed beards (usually one point for Theodore Tiron and two points for Stratelates).

Relics of the saint were widely distributed. In the 12th century, his body was said to have been transferred to Brindisi, and he is there honored as patron; his head is said to be enshrined at Gaeta.

His encounter with a dragon was increasingly transferred to the more-widely venerated Saint George beginning in the 13th century.

Feast days
In the Eastern church, St Theodore of Amasea is celebrated on 8 February or on 17 February or on the 1st Saturday in Lent. In the western church, his date was 9 November, but after the Second Vatican Council and since 1969, he is no longer liturgically celebrated except in certain local calendars.

The Eastern Orthodox Church and those Eastern Catholic churches which follow the Byzantine Rite, celebrate a miracle attributed to St. Theodore Tyro on the First Saturday of Great Lent. At the end of the Presanctified Liturgy on Friday evening (since, liturgically, the day begins at sunset) a special canon to St. Theodore, composed by St. John of Damascus, is chanted. Then the priest blesses kolyva (boiled wheat with honey and raisins) which is distributed to the faithful in commemoration of the following miracle worked by St. Theodore on the First Saturday of Great Lent:

Fifty years after the death of St Theodore, the emperor Julian the Apostate (361-363) commanded the governor of Constantinople during the first week of Great Lent to sprinkle all the food provisions in the marketplace with the blood offered to pagan idols, knowing that the people would be hungry after the strict fasting of the first week. Thus he would force the Christians to unknowingly eat food "polluted" (from the Christian perspective) with the blood of idolatry. St Theodore appeared in a dream to the Archbishop of Constantinople, Eudoxius, ordering him to inform all the Christians that no one should buy anything at the market, but rather to boil the wheat they had at home and eat it sweetened with honey.

After the service, the kolyva is distributed to all who are present and, after Holy Communion and the antidoron, is the first food eaten after the strict fasting of the first week.

St Theodore and Venice
St Theodore was the patron saint of Venice before the relics of Saint Mark were (according to tradition) brought to the city in 828. The original chapel of the Doge was dedicated to St Theodore, though, after the translation of the relics of St Mark, it was superseded by the church of St Mark.

There is some doubt whether this first patron of Venice was St Theodore of Amasea or St Theodore Stratelates, but Otto Demus in 1960, in his authoritative book The Church of San Marco in Venice, stated positively that he was St Theodore Stratelates of Heraclea, and he is followed in this by Fenlon. However, in his later book on the Mosaics of San Marco (1984), Otto Demus points out that none of the 12th-century mosaics which show St Theodore mentions more than his name, and it is suggested that he may have become the patron of the city before the two saints were distinguished. In fact the Venetians never appear to have made any distinction between the different St Theodores. None of the mosaics in St Mark's Basilica (in Venice) show him in military dress.

There were 15 churches in Constantinople dedicated to St Theodore, who was a Greek saint, specially venerated by the Eastern church. Venice had originally been a subject city of the Eastern Roman Empire, and the Venetians saw St Theodore as a symbol of their subjection to Constantinople. The adoption of St Mark as their patron helped to establish their independence.

The new church of St Mark was built between the old chapel of St Theodore and the Ducal Palace. When this was enlarged and rebuilt in the late 11th century, the chapel of St Theodore disappeared in the rebuilding.  There is today a small chapel dedicated to St Theodore, behind St Mark's church, but this was not built until 1486. (It was later occupied by the Inquisition in Venice).

The two Byzantine columns in the Piazzetta in Venice were set up soon after 1172. The eastern column bears a strange animal representing the winged lion of St Mark. A statue representing St Theodore was placed on the western column in 1372, but this was not the statue now to be seen there, which is a composite of several fragments, some antique, including a crocodile to represent a dragon, and was placed there in the second half of the 15th century.

Reputed relics of St Theodore were taken from Mesembria by a Venetian admiral in 1257 and, after being first placed in a Venetian church in Constantinople, were brought to Venice in 1267. They were placed in the church of San Salvatore.

Gallery

See also
 Moreška, dance performed on Sveti Todor (Saint Theodore's) day on the Croatian island of Korčula
 Theodore the Martyr
 Saints Theodore Tyro and Theodore Stratelates Church, Serres

References

Books mentioned
  The Book of Saints (a dictionary of servants of God canonised by the Catholic Church) compiled by the Benedictine monks of St Augustine's Abbey, Ramsgate (6th edition, revised & rest, 1989).
  Butler's Lives of the Saints (originally compiled by the Revd Alban Butler 1756/59), Vol II (February) and XI (November), 1926/38 revised edition, 1995 new full edition.
  Delaney, John J: Dictionary of Saints (1982).
 Hippolyte Delehaye: Les Legendes Grecques des Saints Militaires (Paris 1909).
 Demus, Otto: The Church of San Marco in Venice (Washington 1960).
  Demus, Otto: The Mosaics of San Marco in Venice (4 volumes)  1 The Eleventh & Twelfth Centuries - Text (1984).
  Farmer, David: The Oxford Dictionary of Saints (4th edition, 1997).
  Grotowski, Piotr L.: Arms and armour of the warrior saints: tradition & innovation in Byzantine iconography (843-1261) (Leiden: Brill, 2010).
 The Oxford Companion to the Year (by Bonnie Blackburn & Leofranc Holford-Stevens) (Oxford 1999).
  Walter, Christopher: The Warrior Saints in Byzantine Art and Tradition (2003)

Articles
 B. Fourlas, "Eine frühbyzantinische Silberschale mit der Darstellung des heiligen Theodor", Jahrbuch des Römisch-Germanischen Zentralmuseums Mainz 55, 2008 [2011], pp. 483–528 (on the iconography before iconoclasm).

Notes

External links

 Website of Orthodox Church
 Hagiography from the website of the Orthodox Church in America
 
 Colonnade Statue in St Peter's Square

Saints from Roman Anatolia
Roman Pontus
306 deaths
4th-century Christian martyrs
4th-century Romans
Year of birth unknown
Military saints
Legendary Romans
People from Amasya